Tellisford is a village and civil parish  north-east of Frome in the Mendip district of Somerset, England. The parish includes the village of Woolverton.

History

The village was known as Tefleford in 1001 and Tablesford in 1086 meaning Theabul's ford or ford at a flat place. The parish of Woolverton was part of the hundred of Frome, while Tellisford was part of the Wellow Hundred.

The manor was acquired by the Hungerfords of Farleigh Hungerford in the early 15th century who used the fulling mill to endow their chantry chapel. The cloth making industry continuing until 1912.

The village was partially destroyed by a serious fire in 1785.

Tellisford is one of the Thankful Villages which lost no men in World War I. It also lost no men in World War II.

Governance

Tellisford has a Parish Meeting, where all village electors are automatically members. It is required to meet at least twice a year and does not levy a precept.

The village falls within the Non-metropolitan district of Mendip, which was formed on 1 April 1974 under the Local Government Act 1972, having previously been part of Frome Rural District, which is responsible for local planning and building control, local roads, council housing, environmental health, markets and fairs, refuse collection and recycling, cemeteries and crematoria, leisure services, parks, and tourism.

Somerset County Council is responsible for running the largest and most expensive local services such as education, social services, libraries, main roads, public transport, policing and fire services, trading standards, waste disposal and strategic planning.

It is also part of the Somerton and Frome county constituency represented in the House of Commons of the Parliament of the United Kingdom. It elects one Member of Parliament (MP) by the first past the post system of election.

River Frome

The packhorse bridge over the Frome was extensively overhauled in 1692 by John Ducey of Tellisford and is a Grade II listed building.

Tellisford Mill is a water mill recently converted to hydroelectric generation.

Religious sites
Tellisford's Church of All Saints dates from the 12th century and is Grade II listed. Its tower was added in 1490 and restoration was carried out in 1854. William Parry, an antiquarian, was the rector from 1712 until his resignation in 1715. Today the church is part of the Hardington Vale benefice, centred on Norton St Philip.

The former Church of St. Lawrence at Woolverton dates from the 14th century and is also Grade II listed. The church was declared redundant in 1995 and is now in private ownership.

References

External links

Villages in Mendip District
Civil parishes in Somerset